Bliss GVS Pharma Limited is an Indian pharmaceutical company headquartered in Mumbai, India. Bliss GVS primarily develops, manufactures and markets products across various therapeutic categories including Anti-fungal, Contraceptive, Laxative, Anti-haemorrhoidal, Anti-spasmodic, Anti-malarial, Anti-biotic, Anti-microbial, Anti-inflammatory, Antipyretic, Analgesic and several others.

As of 31 March 2018, its market capitalization is INR 19.20 billion (US$295 m).

History
On 11 December 1984; Bliss GVS was incorporated as Bliss Chemicals and Pharmaceuticals India Limited. During its inception Bliss GVS Pharma operated as a public limited company. In 1986, a vaginal contraceptive under the brand name "Today" was launched by the company which gradually rose to prominence in the Indian as well as the global market. 

On 9 May 2006, under the tenure of Mr. S.N. Kamath as the managing director, the board of directors approved the takeover of "Bliss Chemicals and Pharmaceuticals India Limited" by GVS Lab, causing a change of company's name to its current name "Bliss GVS Pharma Ltd."

In the year 2007, along with the existing suppository manufacturing units, Bliss GVS commissioned for manufacturing units for Dry Syrups and Tablets. The company marked its presence in the Middle-East pharmaceutical market through a strategic joint venture in the year 2012. The Pessaries and Suppositories unit of Bliss GVS received an EU-GMP approval in the year 2011.

The company marked its foray into the dermatology industry with its acquisition of a semi-solid manufacturing unit in 2012. Within the same year, the product range of Bliss GVS expanded with the setting up of Dry Powder manufacturing units for injections, along with other manufacturing units for Nasal Spray, Ampules and  Eye/Ear/Nose Drops.

In 2013, the R&D centre of Bliss GVS expanded to receive DSIR approval.

The company opened its representative office in Philippines in the year 2014.

Operations
Bliss GVS has 5 manufacturing units and has presence in more than 60 countries. Exports accounted for the majority of its revenues. The manufacturing plants of Bliss GVS comply with the international standard on both local as well as the Global scale as per the cGMP norms.

Products & Services
Among the African markets, Bliss GVS is touted as the segment leader for its range of Anti- Malarial products. Several of the brands owned by the company cover extensive range of combined formulations of Artemisinin. These Artemisinin formulations are provided through various dosage ranges including Suppositories and Injections, Tablets, Sachets and Suspensions.

Awards and recognition

For its performance in the exports sector, Bliss GVS received an award from the Indian Government in May 2014 for outstanding exports performance for the FY 2012–13.

In December 2013, Bliss GVS was listed in Moneylife magazine's ‘Wealth Creators 2004-2013' list, an annual study of companies that have created the maximum wealth for investors over the past 10 years.

In September 2011, Bliss GVS was awarded for its Outstanding Efforts in Research and Development by Government of India.

In September 2010, Forbes included Bliss GVS in Asia's 200 Best under a billion.

See also
 Pharmaceutical industry in India
 List of pharmaceutical companies

References

External links
 

Manufacturing companies based in Mumbai
Pharmaceutical companies of India
Pharmaceutical companies established in 1984
1984 establishments in Maharashtra
Companies listed on the National Stock Exchange of India
Companies listed on the Bombay Stock Exchange